The following active airports serve the area around Arthur, Ontario, Canada:

External links 

 
Arthur
Airports
Arthur
Airports